Con Tan Pocos Años (English: With so few years) is the second album from Mexican pop music singer and actress Lucerito. It was released on 1984. The first single was "Música", which was the song that she chose to be on OTI. Once again, it was produced by  through Musart Label.

History
In 1983 Sergio Andrade wrote all the songs on the second album Con Tan Pocos Años, which included the song of the same name that would come to the top of popularity and sales and would make the young artist a star of magnitude. The novelty and originality of the arrangements, and the theme of the lyrics of songs by Andrade, made Lucerito the young star of excellence in those years and became a symbol for children and adolescents.

This second album was recorded entirely in Los Angeles, California, the main studio used by Mr. Andrade was Skyline Recording in Topanga Canyon, and where Andrade mixed Lucerito vocals.

Track listing
The album is composed by ten songs, all of them were arranged, directed and produced by Sergio Andrade, except where it's indicated.

Singles
Música: a soft song that represents the importance of the music for a singer.
Con tan pocos años: a love song, that escapes to a simple classification, and it became a first place of sales and popularity since it expresses the female feelings of any teenager who has fallen in love with an older man.
Contigo: a rhythmic theme in which the singer expresses the importance that represents the closeness of her lover.

Controversy
Sergio Andrade introduced Lucerito as a participant in the Festival OTI of 1983 with the song "Música". Although in the competition the name that appeared in the song was the one of Lucerito, showing as the composer of the song, this was a general comment to suppose that the song was actually written by Mr. Andrade, since some gossips speculate that he was in love with the teenager so he gave her the song away. She lost in the competition.

Personnel
Guitar: Grant Geissman
Bass: Jimmy Johnson
Drums: Ed Greene and Tom Breckline
Pianos and Synthesizers: Sergio Andrade
Strings: Gary Gertzweig

References

1984 albums
Lucero (entertainer) albums